The following is a timeline of the history of the town of Istanbul, Turkey.

Prior to 4th century

 1000 BCE - Thracian tribes find the settlements of Lygos and Semistra.
 657 BCE – Byzantium founded by Greeks.
 513 BCE – City taken by Persians under the rule of Darius the Great.
 479 BCE – Spartans take control of Byzantium from the Persians following their victory at the Battle of Plataea.
 411 BCE – Captured by Sparta.
 408 BCE – Captured by Athens.
 340 BCE – Besieged unsuccessfully by the forces of Philip II of Macedon.
 317 BCE – Battle of Byzantium.
 193 CE 
 Besieged by Septimius Severus. 
 Population: 15,000
 196 – Captured by Septimius Severus. Walls demolished and city razed.
 203 
 Septimius Severus rebuilds the city.
 Hippodrome built (approximate date).
 Mese main street built.
 Baths of Zeuxippus built (approximate date).
 Walls rebuilt (approximate date).
 267 – Captured by the Herules.

4th–15th centuries

 315 – Hagia Irene church built (approximate date).
 324 
 8 November: Constantine renames the city as Constantinoupolis and begins large-scale rebuilding.
 Serpent Column relocated to Byzantium.
 Hippodrome enlarged.
 Population: 20,000
 328 – 4 November: Constantine dedicates Constantinople as capital.
 330 
 11 May: Column of Constantine dedicated.
 Church of the Holy Apostles built (approximate date).
 Chora Church built (approximate date).
 Milion erected (approximate date).
 332
 18 May: Free distribution of food to citizens. 80,000 rations a day from 117 distribution points. 
 359 – First urban prefect appointed.
 360 – 15 February: Great Church of Holy Wisdom inaugurated.
 362 – Kontoskalion built.
 365 – City taken by forces of Procopius.
 368 
 Valens Aqueduct completed.
 Magnaura palace built (approximate date).
 Population: 150,000
 378 – Battle of Constantinople (378): Gothic attack on the city.
 381 – First Council of Constantinople held in the Hagia Irene church.
 382 
 Drought.
 Second line added to the Valens Aqueduct.
 390 – Obelisk of Theodosius installed.
 393 
 Forum of Theodosius rebuilt.
 Column of Theodosius erected.
 Arch of Theodosius completed.
 Population: 200,000
 395 – Earthquake (approximate date).
 400 – City occupied by the rebel forces of Gainas for several months.
 401 – Construction of the Column of Arcadius begins.
 403
 Forum of Arcadius built.
 Column of Aelia Eudoxia erected.
 Earthquake.
 407 – 1 April: Earthquake.
 413 – Theodosian Walls built.
 415 – 10 October: Church of Theodosius II inaugurated.
 420 – Palace of Lausus built (approximate date).
 421 – Cistern of Aetius built.
 425 – 27 February: Pandidakterion school founded by emperor Theodosius II.
 428 – Theodosius Cistern built (approximate date).
 430 – Palace of Antiochos built.
 433 – August: Fire destroys buildings along the Golden Horn.
 437 – 25 September: Constantinian and Theodosian Walls damaged by an earthquake.
 439 – Boukoleon Palace built (approximate date).
 440 – Saint Andrew in Krisei built (approximate date).
 447 
 26 January: Walls damaged by an earthquake.
 Walls rebuilt in 60 days by 16,000 workers under praetorian prefect Constantinus.
 6 November: Constantinian and Theodosian Walls damaged by an earthquake.
 450 
 Column of Marcian erected (approximate date).
 Church of St. Mary of Blachernae built.
 459 
 Construction of the Cistern of Aspar begins.
 Augustaion rebuilt.
 462 – Monastery of Stoudios founded.
 464 – September: Fire begins in the dockyards of the Golden Horn and damages eight of the city's fourteen regions.
 473 – Imperial Library of Constantinople burned.
 476 – Basilica Cistern rebuilt (approximate date).
 478 – 25 September: Walls damaged by an earthquake.
 498 – Riot by the Greens damages the Hippodrome and surrounding area.
 500
 Cistern of Mocius built (approximate date).
 Palace of Blachernae built (approximate date).
 Byzantine structure that would become the Balaban Aga Mosque built (approximate date).
 524 – Church of St. Polyeuctus built.
 527 – Construction of the Church of the Saints Sergius and Bacchus begins.
 532 
 January: Nika riots.
 23 February: Construction of the Hagia Sophia church begins.
 Basilica Cistern rebuilt and enlarged.
 533 – Earthquake.
 536 – Church of the Saints Sergius and Bacchus finished.
 537 
 26 December: Hagia Sophia completed.
 Population: 300,000–500,000
 541 – Plague of Justinian kills 40% of the population.
 543 – Column of Justinian erected.
 545 – Wheat and wine shortage.
 548 – Hagia Irene rebuilt.
 550 – 28 June: Church of the Holy Apostles rebuilt.
 553 – Second Council of Constantinople held.
 554 – 16 August: 554 Anatolia earthquake.
 555 – May–July: Bread shortage.
 557 – 14 December: 557 Constantinople earthquake destroys large parts of the city.
 558 – February–July: Re-occurrence of the plague of Justinian.
 560 – Monastery of the Mother of God at the Spring built.
 562 – November: Drought.
 570 
 Chrysotriklinos built by emperor Justin II (approximate date).
 Orphanage of Saint Paul founded (approximate date).
 573–574 – Re-occurrence of the plague of Justinian.
 575 – Kontoskalion harbor deepened and enlarged.
 576 – Valens Aqueduct repaired and expanded.
 582 – Famine.
 586 – Re-occurrence of the plague of Justinian.
 599 – Re-occurrence of the plague of Justinian.
 626 – Siege of Constantinople (626) by Avars, Slavs and Sassanian Persians.
 674–678 – Siege of Constantinople (674–78).
 680 – Third Council of Constantinople held.
 690 – Hall of Justinianos built by emperor Justinian II (approximate date).
 692 – Quinisext Council held.
 698 – Outbreak of plague.
 717–718 – Siege of Constantinople (717–18).
 740 – October 26: 740 Constantinople earthquake.
 747 – Outbreak of plague.
 753 – Hagia Irene rebuilt.
 758 – Drought.
 766 – Valens Aqueduct restored.
 769 – Church of the Virgin of the Pharos in existence.
 813 – City besieged by Bulgarian forces.
 821 – City besieged by forces of Thomas the Slav.
 860 – Siege of Constantinople (860).
 869 – A portion of the walls collapses in an earthquake.
 870 – Fourth Council of Constantinople (Catholic Church) held.
 880 
 Fourth Council of Constantinople (Eastern Orthodox) held.
 1 May: Nea Ekklesia built.
 907 – Siege of Constantinople (907).
 908 – Lips Monastery built.
 920 – Myrelaion built.
 922 – Battle of Constantinople (922).
 941 – Siege of Constantinople (941).
 971 – Church of Christ of the Chalke built by emperor John I Tzimiskes.
 1000 – Hagios Theodoros built (approximate date).
 1030 – Monastery of St. Mary Peribleptos built by emperor Romanos III Argyros.
 1045 – Monastery of St. George of Mangana built (approximate date).
 1047 – September: Siege by rebels under Leo Tornikios.
 1049 — Theotokos Euergetis Monastery founded.
 1059 – Saint Thekla of the Palace of Blachernae built.
 1060 – Pammakaristos Church built (approximate date).
 1081 – Chora Church rebuilt.
 1087 – Monastery of Christ Pantepoptes built.
 1100 
 Paper in use.
 Saint John the Forerunner by-the-Dome built.
 1110 
 Kecharitomene Monastery built.
 Maiden's Tower built.
 1136 – Monastery of the Pantocrator completed.
 1147 – September: Battle of Constantinople (1147)
 1181 – 2 May: Uprising of Maria Komnene against the rule of Alexios Komnenos suppressed.
 1182 – April: Massacre of the Latins.
 1197 – 25 July: Fire destroys the Latin Quarter and other buildings.
 1200 – Theotokos Kyriotissa built (approximate date).
 1203 – Siege of Constantinople (1203) by the Fourth Crusade, in which Alexius IV was able to usurp the throne after Alexius III fled to Thrace.
 1204 – April: Siege of Constantinople (1204) by the Fourth Crusade, in which the Byzantines were overwhelmed and the city thoroughly sacked.
 1235 – Siege of Constantinople (1235).
 1260 – Siege of Constantinople (1260).
 1261 
 25 July: Captured by Nicaean forces under Alexios Strategopoulos.
 Population: 35,000
 1268 – Kyra Martha nunnery founded.
 1289 – June: Earthquake.
 1304 – South Church of Lips Monastery built.
 1307 – Monastery of Christ Philanthropos built.
 1325 – Church of San Domenico built.
 1332 – 17 January: Earthquake.
 1347
 14 October: Earthquake.
 18 October: Earthquake.
 1348 
 Galata Tower built.
 Population: 80,000
 1351 – 28 May: Fifth Council of Constantinople completed.
 1376 – City besieged by forces of Andronikos IV Palaiologos.
 1394 
 Blockade of the city begun by Ottoman forces under Bayezid I.
 Anadoluhisarı fortress built.

15th–18th centuries
 1402 
 Ottoman blockade lifted.
 Earthquake.
 1410 – June: Battle of Kosmidion.
 1411 – Siege of Constantinople (1411).
 1422 – Siege of Constantinople (1422).
 1427 – Church of Saint Benoit built.
 1437 
 4 September: Earthquake.
 25 November: Earthquake.
 1452 – Rumelihisarı fortress built.
 1453
 6 April-29 May: Final Siege of Constantinople; City besieged by Ottoman forces; Mehmed II in power.
 Capital of the Ottoman Empire relocated to Constantinople from Edirne.
 Hagia Sophia (converted from Orthodox cathedral to mosque) in use.
 Medrese predecessor of Istanbul University established.
 Population: 40,000–50,000
 1454 
 18 April: Treaty of Constantinople (1454)
 Imperial Arsenal established.
 Phanar Greek Orthodox College founded.
 Ağa hamamı built.
 1458 
 Yedikule Fortress built.
 Eyüp Sultan Mosque built.
 1460 – Grand Bazaar built (approximate date).
 1465 – Topkapı Palace construction begins.
 1467 – Turkish State Mint established.
 1470 
 Fatih Mosque built.
 Sahn-ı Seman Medrese established.
 1471 – Rum Mehmed Pasha Mosque built.
 1472 – Tiled Kiosk built.
 1478 – Galata Mosque in use.
 1479 – 25 January: Treaty of Constantinople (1479)
 1481 – Galatasaray High School established.
 1488 – Complex of Sultan Bayezid II built.
 1491 – Firuz Agha Mosque built in Fatih.
 1497 – Gazi Atik Ali Pasha Mosque built.
 1505 – İskender Pasha Mosque, Fatih built (approximate date).
 1506 – Bayezid II Mosque built.
 1509 – 1509 Constantinople earthquake.
 1512 – Vasat Atik Ali Pasha Mosque built.
 1520 – Suleiman the Magnificent becomes Sultan of the Ottoman Empire.
 1521 – Ibrahim Pasha Palace in use.
 1528 – Yavuz Selim Mosque built.
 1531 – Piri Mehmed Pasha Mosque built.
 1533 – 22 July: Treaty of Constantinople (1533).
 1535 – French embassy established.
 1539 – Haseki Sultan Complex built.
 1541 – Tomb of Hayreddin Barbarossa built.
 1542 – Defterdar Mosque built.
 1548 
 Mihrimah Sultan Mosque (Üsküdar) built.
 Şehzade Mosque built.
 1550 
 Mosque with the Spiral Minaret built.
 Yavuz Sultan Selim Madras built.
 1551 – Hadim Ibrahim Pasha Mosque built.
 1554 – Coffee house in business.
 1555 – November/December: Sinan Pasha Mosque (Istanbul) built.
 1556 – Bath-house of Haseki Hurrem Sultan built.
 1557 
 Süleymaniye Mosque built.
 Süleymaniye Hamam bath built.
 1559 – Caferağa Medresseh built.
 1560 – İskender Pasha Mosque, Kanlıca built.
 1563 – Rüstem Pasha Mosque built.
 1567 – Sokollu Mehmed Pasha Mosque (Büyükçekmece) built.
 1570 – Mihrimah Sultan Mosque (Edirnekapı) built.
 1571 – Sokollu Mehmed Pasha Mosque (Kadırga) built.
 1572 – Kara Ahmed Pasha Mosque built.
 1573 – Piyale Pasha Mosque built.
 1577 – Observatory of Taqi al-Din built.
 1578 – Sokollu Mehmed Pasha Mosque (Azapkapı) built.
 1580 – Kılıç Ali Pasha Complex built.
 1581 – Şemsi Pasha Mosque built.
 1583 – 26 March: First British ambassador to Constantinople arrives.
 1584 
 Çemberlitaş Hamamı (bath) built.
 Molla Çelebi Mosque built.
 Church of St. Mary Draperis, Istanbul established.
 1586 
 Atik Valide Mosque built.
 Mesih Mehmed Pasha Mosque built.
 1590 
 21 March: Treaty of Constantinople (1590).
 Zal Mahmud Pasha Mosque built.
 1604 – Church of SS Peter and Paul, Istanbul built.
 1612 – 20 November: Treaty of Nasuh Pasha.
 1613 – Aynalıkavak Palace built.
 1615 – Cossack raid on Istanbul (1615)
 1616 – Sultan Ahmed Mosque built.
 1620 – Cossack raid on Istanbul (1620)
 1624 – Cossack raids on Istanbul (1624)
 1648 – Atmeydanı incident.
 1656 – 26 February: Çınar incident.
 1660
 24–26 July: Great Fire of 1660.
 New Bazaar built.
 1665 – Valide Sultan Mosque built.
 1678 – Church of St. Mary Draperis rebuilt.
 1700 – 13 July: Treaty of Constantinople (1700).
 1710 – Yeni Valide Mosque built.
 1728 – Fountain of Ahmed III built.
 1729 – Fountain of Ahmed III (Üsküdar) built.
 1730 – 20 September: Patrona Halil rebellion.
 1732 – Tophane Fountain built.
 1736 – 24 September: Treaty of Constantinople (1736).
 1742 – 15 April: Apostolic Vicariate of Constantinople established.
 1746 – Kalenderhane Mosque consecrated.
 1753 – Yedikule Hospital founded.
 1755 – Nuruosmaniye Mosque built.
 1758 – Şemsipaşa Primary School established.
 1763 – Laleli Mosque built.
 1766 – Earthquake.
 1769 – Zeynep Sultan Mosque built.
 1771 – Fatih Mosque rebuilt.
 1773 – Naval Engineering at Golden Horn Naval Shipyard college founded.
 1774 – Rami Barracks built.
 1781 – Emirgan Mosque built.
 1793 – Balıklı Greek Hospital rebuilt.
 1795 
 Imperial School of Military Engineering established.
 Mühendishane-i Berri Hümayun printing house established.

19th century
 1800 – Eyüp Sultan Mosque rebuilt.
 1801 – Big Selimiye Mosque built.
 1806 – Taksim Military Barracks built.
 1807 – 29 May: Coup of 1807.
 1808 – 28 July: Coup of 1808.
 1813 – Hidayet Mosque built.
 1814 – Sultan Mahmut Fountain built.
 1821 – Constantinople massacre of 1821.
 1825 – Pangaltı Mkhitaryan School established.
 1826 
 15 June: Auspicious Incident.
 Nusretiye Mosque built.
 1828 
 6 February: Selimiye Barracks built.
 Beyazıt Tower built.
 1831 – October: Takvim-i Vekayi newspaper established.
 1832 
 February: Treaty of Constantinople (1832).
 Beylerbeyi Palace Tunnel built.
 Davutpaşa Barracks built.
 1833 – 8 July: Treaty of Hünkâr İskelesi.
 1834 
 Military Academy established.
 31 May: Surp Pırgiç Armenian Hospital opened.
 1836 – 3 September: Hayratiye Bridge built.
 1837 – Surp Agop Hospital opened.
 1843 – Church of SS Peter and Paul rebuilt.
 1844 – Naum Theatre opened.
 1845 
 Galata Bridge built.
 21 September: Mekteb-i Fünun-ı İdadiye military high school established.
 1846 
 Cathedral of the Holy Spirit built.
 1 July: Armenian Evangelical Church established.
 23 July: House of Multiple Sciences established (predecessor of Istanbul University).
 1848 
 Küçük Mecidiye Mosque built.
 Nusretiye Clock Tower built.
 Ottoman Military College established.
 1849 – 9 October: Bulgarian St. Stephen Church inaugurated.
 1850 
 21 March: Istanbul Girls High School inaugurated.
 22 March: Cağaloğlu Anadolu Lisesi established.
 1851 
 Hırka-i Şerif Mosque built.
 Emirgan Pier opened.
 1852 
 Taşkışla houses built.
 Taksim German Hospital founded.
 1853 – Üsküdar Ferry Terminal opened.
 1854 – Teşvikiye Mosque built.
 1855 
 Ihlamur Palace built.
 Dolmabahçe Mosque built.
 1856 
 27 November: Lycée Notre Dame de Sion Istanbul established.
 Dolmabahçe Palace built in Beşiktaş.
 Ortaköy Mosque built.
 Ottoman Bank founded.
 Fenerbahçe Lighthouse built.
 1857 
 Küçüksu Palace built.
 Ahırkapı Feneri lighthouse built.
 1859 
 12 February: Mekteb-i Mülkiye-i Şahane college established.
 Şişli Greek Orthodox Cemetery founded.
 1861 
 14 April: Bulgarian Catholic Apostolic Vicariate of Constantinople established.
 Adile Sultan Palace built.
 Al-Jawâ'ib begins publication.
 Liceo Italiano di Istanbul founded.
 1862 – Tekel tobacco company founded.
 1863 
 16 September: Robert College opened.
 First painting exhibition sponsored by Sultan Abdülaziz.
 1865 
 Beylerbeyi Palace built.
 Altunizade Mosque built.
 1866 – Gedikpaşa Tiyatrosu theatre established.
 1867 – Çırağan Palace built.
 1868 
 1 April: Court of Cassation established.
 1 May: Deutsche Schule Istanbul founded.
 Kandilli Observatory established.
 Galatasaray Museum established.
 1870 
 June 5: Fire in Pera.
 24 November: Diyojen magazine founded.
 Malta Kiosk built.
 1871 
 Feriye Palace built.
 American College for Girls established in Arnavutköy.
 1872 
 Pertevniyal Valide Sultan Mosque built.
 Haydarpaşa railway station opened.
 Pertevniyal High School founded.
 El Tiempo Ladino-language newspaper founded.
 22 July: 
 Bakırköy railway station opened.
 Küçükçekmece railway station opened.
 27 July: Sirkeci railway station opened.
 22 September: 
 Bostancı railway station opened.
 Erenköy railway station opened.
 Feneryolu railway station opened.
 Kartal railway station opened.
 Küçükyalı railway station opened.
 1873 
 27 April: Fenerbahçe railway station opened.
 Darüşşafaka High School founded.
 1874 – Population: 827,750
 1875 
 17 January: 
 Beyoğlu (Tünel) railway station opened.
 Karaköy (Tünel) railway station opened.
 Esma Sultan Mansion built.
 1876 
 3 January: Akhtar Persian-language magazine established.
 Muharrir magazine established.
 Üsküdar American Academy founded.
 Göztepe railway station built.
 1877 – 18 December: Central Committee for Defending Albanian Rights formed.
 1878 
 26 June: Tercüman-ı Hakikat newspaper first published.
 Istanbul Bar Association established.
 1879
 12 October: Society for the Publication of Albanian Writings formed.
 1880 
 14 September: Hagia Triada Greek Orthodox Church, Istanbul built.
 Yıldız Palace built.
 1882 
 Palazzo Corpi built.
 Ottoman Public Debt Administration building constructed.
 School of Fine Arts established.
 Numune-i Terakki school founded.
 14 January: Istanbul Chamber of Commerce established.
 1883
 School of Economics established.
 Orient Express (Paris–Istanbul) begins operating.
 Drita Albanian magazine begins publishing.
 1886 
 1 September: Getronagan Armenian High School established.
 Yıldız Hamidiye Mosque built.
 1887 
 Ertuğrul Tekke Mosque built.
 Hidayet Mosque rebuilt.
 1890 
 Yıldız Clock Tower built.
 Kum Kapu demonstration.
 Tekel Birası brewery established.
 1891 – 13 June: Imperial Museum founded.
 1892 
 Pera Palace Hotel built.
 Mekteb-i Aşiret-i Humayun school established.
 1893 – Zografeion Lyceum inaugurated.
 1894
 10 July: an earthquake in the Gulf of İzmit kills about 1,349 people.
 Pando's Creamery in business.
 1895 
 Dolmabahçe Clock Tower built.
 Russian Archaeological Institute of Constantinople established.
 Lycée Sainte-Euphémie established.
 1896 
 1 January: Kurtuluş S.K. founded.
 26 August: Occupation of the Ottoman Bank.
 1897 
 Treaty of Constantinople (1897).
 Istanbul Naval Museum established.
 Tokatlıyan Hotels built.
 1899 – 20 April: Port of Haydarpaşa opened.

20th century

 1900 – Port of Istanbul opened.
 1901 
 27 January: German Fountain inaugurated.
 Ulus Sephardi Jewish Cemetery established.
 1903 
 4 March: Beşiktaş J.K. founded.
 Moda F.C. founded.
 1904 
 Istanbul Football League established.
 Elpis F.C. founded.
 HMS Imogene F.C. founded.
 1905 
 21 July: Yıldız assassination attempt.
 30 October: Galatasaray S.K. founded.
 1907 
 3 May: Fenerbahçe S.K. (football) founded.
 Khedive Palace built.
 Etfal Hospital Clock Tower built.
 1908 
 Istanbul declared a province with nine constituent districts.
 Ottoman National Olympic Society founded.
 Şükrü Saracoğlu Stadium inaugurated.
 Kabataş Erkek Lisesi established.
 Karagöz magazine established.
 Osmanischer Lloyd established.
 Demet magazine established.
 Jamanak Armenian-language newspaper established.
 El Gugeton Ladino-language newspaper established.
 Vefa S.K. founded.
 Beykoz S.K.D. founded.
 Üsküdar Anadolu S.K. founded.
 Strugglers F.C. founded.
 1909 
 31 March Incident
 National Bank of Turkey established.
 Scouting and Guiding Federation of Turkey predecessor formed.
 Al-Muntada al-Adabi formed.
 Shehbal magazine founded.
 Altınordu İdman Yurdu S.K. founded.
 1910 
 Mısır Apartment built.
 Suadiye railway station opened.
 Hamevasser newspaper established.
 Apikoğlu company founded.
 22 April: Hikmet magazine established.
 1911 
 Yıldız Technical University established.
 Istanbul International Community School established.
 Erenköy Girls High School established.
 Marmnamarz sports magazine begins publishing.
 Küçükçekmece S.K. founded.
 Beylerbeyi S.K. founded.
 Rumblers F.C. founded.
 11 June: Greek Byzantine Catholic Church established.
 23 July: Monument of Liberty, Istanbul completed.
 1912 
 İnterbank moves to Constantinople.
 Church of St. Anthony of Padua, Istanbul built.
 Gülhane Park opens.
 Orfeon Records established.
 Istanbul Friday League established.
 Hilal S.K. founded.
 Telefoncular F.C. founded.
 25 March: Turkish Hearths founded.
 1913 
 23 January: 1913 Ottoman coup d'état.
 29 September: Treaty of Constantinople
 Turkish and Islamic Arts Museum opens.
 Bebek Mosque built.
 Veliefendi Race Course opened.
 Anadolu Hisarı İdman Yurdu S.K. founded.
 1914 
 Population: 1,125,000
 25 January: Electric tram line begins operating on the European side.
 11 February: Silahtarağa Power Station opened.
 28 June: Darülbedayi founded.
 Metrohan Building built.
 Darülbedayi theatre founded.
 Istanbul Championship League established.
 Beyoğlu S.K. established.
 1915 
 24 April: Deportation of Armenian intellectuals on 24 April 1915.
 15 June: The 20 Hunchakian gallows hanging occurs in Beyazıt Square.
 Göztepe railway station rebuilt.
 1916 
 Aviation Martyrs' Monument completed.
 Kandilli Anatolian High School for Girls established.
 1917 – Darülelhan conservatory established.
 1918 
 13 November: Occupation of Constantinople by Allied forces begins, per Armistice of Mudros.
 November: Karakol society founded against the occupation of Constantinople.
 1919 
 Sultanahmet demonstrations.
 Sultanahmet Jail built.
 Eyüpspor founded.
 1920 – 5 March: Green Crescent established.
 1921 
 15 January: Kasımpaşa S.K. founded.
 Taksim Stadium established.
 Istanbul Men's Volleyball League established.
 1922 – Tayyare Apartments built.
 1923
 4 October: Allied occupation ends and the newly-formed Republic of Turkey takes control.
 13 October: Turkish capital relocated from Istanbul to Ankara.
 Vatan newspaper established.
 Istanbul Maltepespor founded.
 1924 
 7 May: Cumhuriyet newspaper established.
 15 October: Bakırköy Psychiatric Hospital founded.
 Airport opened in Yeşilköy.
 Emek (movie theater) opened.
 1925 – 12 July: Apoyevmatini Greek-language newspaper founded.
 1926 
 4 January: İstanbulspor founded.
 Istanbul 4th Vakıf Han built.
 Fatih Karagümrük S.K. founded.
 1927 
 6 March: Süreyya Opera House opened.
 Istanbul Basketball League established.
 Feriköy S.K. founded.
 1928 
 Electric tram line begins operating on the Asian side.
 Paşakapısı Prison established.
 1929 – Istanbul Medical Chamber founded.
 1930 
 City renamed "Istanbul".
 Istanbul Shield established.
 1931 – Italian Synagogue established.
 1932 – Fil Bridge built.
 1933 
 1 August: Istanbul University established.
 October: Güneş S.K. founded.
 Istanbul Zoology Museum established.
 1934 – 26 September: Haydarpaşa High School established.
 1936 – 
 Istanbul University Observatory established.
 Beşiktaş Atatürk Anadolu Lisesi high school founded.
 1938 – 10 November: Death of Atatürk.
 1940
 31 August: Marmara (newspaper) Armenian-language newspaper begins publishing.
 Berlin–Baghdad railway begins operating.
 Atatürk Bridge built.
 Sarıyer S.K. founded.
 Taksim S.K. founded.
 Population: 789,346.
 1942 – 
 VitrA (sanitaryware) company established.
 Istanbul Football Cup established.
 1943 – Taksim Gezi Park built.
 1944
 22 February: Ülker company established.
 Faculty of Arts and Sciences Building, Istanbul University built.
 Yıldız Holding established.
 1945 
 Population: 860,558.
 Ali Sami Yen Stadium built.
 Beyti (Istanbul) restaurant founded.
 Aşiyan Museum established.
 Yıldırım Bosna S.K. founded.
 1946 
 Cezmi Or Memorial established.
 Modaspor (basketball) founded.
 1947 
 19 May: İnönü Stadium opens in Beşiktaş.
 9 August: Cemil Topuzlu Open-Air Theatre opened.
 29 October: Şalom begins publishing.
 1948
 1 May: Hürriyet newspaper begins publishing.
 Bütün Dünya periodical begins publishing.
 1949 
 3 June: Istanbul Lütfi Kırdar International Convention and Exhibition Center opened.
 18 August: Kartal S.K. founded.
 Şişli Mosque built.
 İstanbul newspaper begins publishing.
 Bakırköyspor founded.
 1950 
 Population: 1,000,022.
 3 May: Milliyet begins publishing.
 Hünkar (restaurant) established.
 Pendikspor founded.
 Paşabahçe S.K. founded.
 Alibeyköy S.K. founded.
 1951 
 25 March: Neve Shalom Synagogue inaugurated.
 Ismet Baba Fish Restaurant established.
 1952 
 9 March: ITU TV broadcast. First Turkish television broadcast.
 Türk Ticaret Bankası relocated to Istanbul.
 1953
 1 March: ITU School of Mines established.
 Tiled Kiosk opens as a museum.
 Zeytinburnuspor founded.
 1954 
 Arçelik company established.
 Alarko Holding company established.
 Migros Türk company established.
 İçmeler railway station opened.
 Akbank moves to Istanbul.
 Tuzlaspor founded.
 1955 
 10 June: Hilton Istanbul Bosphorus opened.
 6–7 September: Istanbul pogrom.
 4 December: 
 Cankurtaran railway station opened.
 Florya railway station opened.
 Kazlıçeşme railway station opened.
 Yenimahalle railway station opened.
 Zeytinburnu railway station opened.
 Beko company founded.
 Kadıköy Anadolu Lisesi founded.
 Adam Mickiewicz Museum, Istanbul founded.
 Küçükçekmece railway station rebuilt.
 Istanbul Women's Volleyball League established.
 1956 
 Divan Istanbul built.
 Demirören Group founded.
 Tekfen Construction and Installation founded.
 Tabanlıoğlu Architects founded.
 Yeşilyurt Women's Volleyball Team founded.
 1957
 Enka İnşaat ve Sanayi A.Ş. company founded.
 Pudding Shop restaurant opened.
 1958
 Birleşik Fon Bankası founded.
 Banks Association of Turkey founded.
 Küçük Emek cinema opens.
 1959 
 Beşiktaş Anadolu Lisesi founded.
 Sait Faik Abasıyanık Museum opened.
 Karaköy Pier opened.
 Güzelyalı railway station opened.
 Bayrampaşaspor founded.
 1960 
 Erler Film company founded.
 Ekonomist magazine founded.
 1961
 March: Hürriyet Daily News founded.
 Yenibosna S.K. founded.
 1962 
 E.C.A. Elginkan Anadolu Lisesi founded.
 Telsiz ve Radyo Amatörleri Cemiyeti founded.
 1963 – Gaziosmanpaşaspor founded.
 1964 
 Askam (trucks) company founded.
 Harbiye Muhsin Ertuğrul Stage opens.
 1965 
 Population: 2,293,823 (districts of Adalar, Bakırköy, Beşiktaş, Beykoz, Beyoğlu, Çatalca, Eyüp, Fatih, Gaziosmanpaşa, Kadıköy, Kartal, Sarıyer, Silivri, Şile, Şişli, Üsküdar, Yalova, and Zeytinburnu).
 Yapı Merkezi company founded.
 1966 – İdealtepe railway station opened.
 1967
 15 June: Confederation of Progressive Trade Unions of Turkey holds first meeting.
 Kaynarca railway station opened.
 Moğollar established.
 1968
 Yedikule Anadolu Lisesi founded.
 Küçükköyspor founded.
 1969 
 17 January: Vehbi Koç Foundation established.
 16 February: Bloody Sunday (1969).
 12 April: Atatürk Cultural Center dedicated.
 Efes Beverage Group established.
 1970 
 Eyüboğlu High School founded.
 22 April: Türkiye newspaper begins publishing.
 1971 
 2 November: Beyoğlu station re-opened after reconstruction.
 Turkish Industry and Business Association established.
 Turkish Society for Electron Microscopy established.
 1972 – Desa company established.
 1973
 12 January: Millî Gazete begins publishing.
 19 April: Dostluk S.K. founded.
 Bosphorus Bridge built.
 Ömerli Dam built.
 50th Anniversary of the Republic Sculptures erected.
 Istanbul International Music Festival begins.
 Istanbul Foundation for Culture and Arts established.
 1974 
 10 September: Haliç Bridge opened.
 Derimod company founded.
 1975 
 30 January: Turkish Airlines Flight 345 crash.
 Çukurova (construction firm) established.
 Istanbul Technical University Turkish Music State Conservatory founded.
 1976 
 Muhammad Maarifi Mosque built.
 Çamlıca TRT Television Tower built.
 Polin Waterparks company founded.
 1977 
 1 May: Taksim Square massacre.
 1978 – December: Kadınca women's magazine begins publishing.
 1979 – Istanbul Marathon begins.
 1980 
 14 October: Sadberk Hanım Museum opened.
 Cengiz Holding established.
 Bogazici University Sports Fest founded.
 1981
 2 March: Dünya founded.
 Koçbank founded.
 Can Yayınları publishing company founded.
 Metris Prison established.
 1982 
 19 February: Güneş founded.
 International Istanbul Film Festival begins.
 Istanbul Book Fair inaugurated.
 Atatürk High School of Science, Istanbul established.
 World Trade Center Istanbul established.
 Timas Publishing Group established.
 İletişim Yayınları publishing company established.
 Kaynak Yayınları publishing company established.
 Malta Kiosk restored and re-opened.
 Ezginin Günlüğü band formed.
 1983 
 ITU Mustafa Inan Library opened.
 Enka SK founded.
 İstanbul Güngörenspor founded.
 1984
 March: Hotel Yeşil Ev established.
 March 23: Municipality of Greater Istanbul established.
 Population: 2,951,000 (estimate).
 1986 – 6 September: Neve Shalom Synagogue massacre. Gunmen kill 22 Jews in an attack orchestrated by Palestinian militant Abu Nidal.
 1987 – 1 October: Galleria Ataköy opened.
 1988 
 9 May: TGC Press Media Museum established.
 3 July: Fatih Sultan Mehmet Bridge built.
 Koç School opened.
 1989
 3 September: Istanbul Metro begins operating.
 Kadıköy Haldun Taner Stage in use.
 1990 – İstanbul Başakşehir F.K. established.
 1991 – Swissôtel The Bosphorus opened.
 1992 
 1 March: Neve Shalom Synagogue bomb attack. No casualties or damage.
 13 June: T1 (Istanbul Tram) line opened.
 Istanbul Hezarfen Airfield opened.
 1993 
 Sabancı Center built.
 International Defence Industry Fair established.
 Akbank Sanat opened.
 Koç University opened.
 6–7 May: 2nd ECO Summit held.
 18 December: Akmerkez opened.
 1994
 31 October: Istanbul Bilgi University established.
 December: Galata Bridge rebuilt.
 Esenler Coach Terminal built.
 Recep Tayyip Erdoğan becomes mayor of greater Istanbul.
 Population: 7,615,500 in city (approximate estimate).
 1995 – 12–15 March: Gazi Quarter riots.
 1996 
 United Nations Conference on Human Settlements held.
 Üsküdar Belediyespor founded.
 1998 – Ahmet Cömert Sport Hall built.
 1999
 13–14 March: 1999 Istanbul bombings.
 26 July – 1 August: 1999 European Aquatics Championships held.
 The 7.6  İzmit earthquake shakes northwestern Turkey with a maximum Mercalli intensity of IX (Violent), leaving 17,118–17,127 dead and 43,953–50,000 injured in the region.
 Changa (restaurant) established.

21st century

 2000
 City expands to include districts of Avcılar, Bağcılar, Bahçelievler, Esenler, Güngören, Maltepe, Sultanbeyli, and Tuzla (approximate date).
 Population: 10,018,735.
 Tekstilkent Plaza built.
 6 May: Istanbul Postal Museum established.
 26 August: Isbank Tower 1 built.
 16 September: M2 (Istanbul Metro) opened.
 2001 
 Istanbul Sabiha Gökçen International Airport opened.
 21 September: Tepe Nautilus mall opened.
 2002 
 Tekfen Tower built.
 Endem TV Tower built.
 Sakıp Sabancı Museum opened.
 2003
 Istanbul Pride begins.
 2 May: Miniatürk opened.
 November: 2003 Istanbul bombings.
 Miniatürk park opens.
 2004
 City boundaries become coterminous with those of Istanbul Province.
 Kadir Topbaş becomes mayor of Greater Istanbul.
 March 9, 2004 attack on Istanbul restaurant.
 12 and 15 May: Eurovision Song Contest 2004 held.
 28–29 June: City hosts 2004 Istanbul summit.
 11 December: İstanbul Modern museum of art opened.
 2005 – April: Sabancı Performing Arts Center opens in Tuzla.
 2006 – 6 June: Kanyon Shopping Mall opened.
 2007
 19 January: Assassination of Hrant Dink.
 29 April: Republic Protest.
 12 September: T4 (Istanbul Tram) opened.
 Şişli Plaza built.
 Süreyya Opera House in Kadıköy.
 2008
 Istanbul expands to include districts of Arnavutköy, Ataşehir, Başakşehir, Beylikdüzü, Çekmeköy, Esenyurt, Sancaktepe, and Sultangazi.
 1 February: Istanbul fireworks explosion in Davutpaşa.
 9 July: 2008 United States consulate in Istanbul attack.
 21 July: 70 Million Steps Against Coups.
 27 July: 2008 Istanbul bombings.
 Labour strike in Tuzla.
 2009
 7 May: Şakirin Mosque opened.
 17 October: Istanbul Congress Center opened
 City districts increased from 32 to 39.
 Istanbul Congress Center built.
 Depo art space founded.
 2010
 14 January: Harbiye Muhsin Ertuğrul Stage rebuilt.
 28 August – 12 September: 2010 FIBA World Championship held.
 31 October: 2010 Istanbul bombing.
 Voldemort Towers Istanbul built.
 Baklahorani (carnival) revived.
 2011 
 4 March: Istanbul Sapphire opened.
 18 March: Istanbul Shopping Fest inaugurated.
 July: Istanbul Justice Palace built.
 6 October: Ora Arena opened.
 2012
 26 February 2012 Istanbul rally to commemorate the Khojaly massacre held.
 17 August: M4 (Istanbul Metro) line opened.
 Sancaklar Mosque built.
 MEF University opened.
 Forensic Science Institute of Turkey opened.
 Museum of Innocence opens.
 Population: 13,854,740.
 2013
 28 May: Gezi Park protests begin in Taksim Square.
 14 June: M3 (Istanbul Metro) line opened.
 10 October: Zorlu Center opened.
 29 October: 
 Marmaray Tunnel phase of the Marmaray project opened for public use.
 Ayrılık Çeşmesi railway station opened.
 2014
 15 February: Golden Horn Metro Bridge opened.
 1 September: Raffles Istanbul hotel opened.
 29 November: Pope Francis visit to meet with Patriarch Bartholomew I and Muslim leaders.
 Sancaklar Mosque built in Büyükçekmece.
 Istanbul Half Marathon established.
 2015
 6 January: 2015 Istanbul suicide bombing.
 17 March: 2015 SAHA Istanbul, Defence, Aviation and Space Clustering Association established.
 19 April: M6 (Istanbul Metro) line opened.
 26 May: Mehmet Çakır Cultural and Sports Center opened.
 1 December: 2015 Istanbul metro bombing.
 23 December: 2015 Sabiha Gökçen Airport bombing.
 2016 
 12 January: January 2016 Istanbul bombing.
 19 March: March 2016 Istanbul bombing.
 11 April: Vodafone Park opened.
 7 June: June 2016 Istanbul bombing.
 28 June: Istanbul Atatürk Airport attack.
 15–16 July: 2016 Turkish coup d'état attempt.
 20 August: Beykoz University established.
 23 August: Özgürlükçü Demokrasi launched.
 26 August: Yavuz Sultan Selim Bridge opened.
 6 October: October 2016 Istanbul bombing.
 10 December: December 2016 Istanbul bombings.
 22 December: Eurasia Tunnel opened.
 2017 
 1 January: 2017 Istanbul nightclub shooting.
 9 July: 2017 March for Justice.
 29 October: F3 (Istanbul Metro) line opened.
 15 December: M5 (Istanbul Metro) line opened.
 Population: 15,029,231 (estimate, urban agglomeration).
 2018 
 Saha Expo first held.
 20–23 September: Teknofest Istanbul held.
 29 October: Istanbul Airport opened.
Prince MBS of Saudi Arabia sends a group of government agents to murder prominent critic, Jamal Khashoggi. His death is just a few days before his sixtieth birthday.
2022 
 13 November: an explosion on İstiklal Avenue in the Beyoğlu district left at least six people dead and 81 injured.

See also
 History of Istanbul
 List of mayors of Istanbul
 List of sultans of the Ottoman Empire, 1450s–1920s
 Timelines of other cities in Turkey: Ankara, Bursa, İzmir

References

This article incorporates information from the German Wikipedia and Turkish Wikipedia.

Bibliography

Published in 18th–19th centuries

Published in 20th century

Published in 21st century
 
Europe's Muslim Capital by Philip Mansel in the June 2003 issue of History Today

External links

 Europeana. Items related to Istanbul, various dates.
 
 
 

Istanbul
Istanbul-related lists